The Devil's Kitchen Reading Awards are given every year at the Devil's Kitchen Fall Literary Festival at Southern Illinois University in Carbondale, Illinois. The prize was first given in 2005. From 2005-2014, there were two prizes given each year, one in poetry and one in prose. Starting in 2015, there were three categories: poetry, prose fiction, and prose non-fiction. The judges for the award are drawn from the faculty of the MFA program in creative writing at SIU.

Past winners

References 

Southern Illinois University Carbondale
American literary awards